Donn Fortheringham Porter  (March 1, 1931 – September 7, 1952) was a soldier in the United States Army during the Korean War. He posthumously received the Medal of Honor for his actions on September 7, 1952.

Porter joined the Army from Baltimore, Maryland in 1951, and originally trained as an airborne ranger. He is buried in Arlington National Cemetery Arlington, Virginia. His grave can be found in Section 33, Lot 4357.

Medal of Honor citation
Rank and organization: Sergeant, U.S. Army, Company G, 14th Infantry Regiment, 25th Infantry Division

Place and date: Near Mundung-ni, Korea, September 7, 1952

Entered service at: Baltimore, Md. Born: March 1, 1931, Sewickley, Pa. Graduated Saint James School, MD. Class of 1949

G.O. No.: 64, August 18, 1953.

Citation:

Sgt. Porter, a member of Company G, distinguished himself by conspicuous gallantry and outstanding courage above and beyond the call of duty in action against the enemy. Advancing under cover of intense mortar and artillery fire, 2 hostile platoons attacked a combat outpost commanded by Sgt. Porter, destroyed communications, and killed 2 of his 3-man crew. Gallantly maintaining his position, he poured deadly accurate fire into the ranks of the enemy, killing 15 and dispersing the remainder. After falling back under a hail of fire, the determined foe reorganized and stormed forward in an attempt to overrun the outpost. Without hesitation, Sgt. Porter jumped from his position with bayonet fixed and, meeting the onslaught and in close combat, killed 6 hostile soldiers and routed the attack. While returning to the outpost, he was killed by an artillery burst, but his courageous actions forced the enemy to break off the engagement and thwarted a surprise attack on the main line of resistance. Sgt. Porter's incredible display of valor, gallant self-sacrifice, and consummate devotion to duty reflect the highest credit upon himself and uphold the noble traditions of the military service.

See also

List of Medal of Honor recipients
List of Korean War Medal of Honor recipients

Notes

References

1931 births
1952 deaths
People from Sewickley, Pennsylvania
United States Army Medal of Honor recipients
American military personnel killed in the Korean War
United States Army Rangers
Burials at Arlington National Cemetery
Korean War recipients of the Medal of Honor
United States Army soldiers
United States Army personnel of the Korean War